Erdoğan Arsal (born 20 December 1933) is a Turkish sailor. He competed in the Flying Dutchman event at the 1964 Summer Olympics.

References

External links
 

1933 births
Living people
Turkish male sailors (sport)
Olympic sailors of Turkey
Sailors at the 1964 Summer Olympics – Flying Dutchman
Place of birth missing (living people)